Education Service Area Office is a Thai agency in Office of the Basic Education Commission of Thailand, Ministry of Education founded in 2009,Its responsibilities include the administration of education from primary education or secondary education in each responsibility area include Primary Education Services Area and Secondary Education Services Area

Primary Education Services Area

Secondary Education Services Area
42 area

 Bangkok (Phaya Thai District Bang Sue District Dusit District Samphanthawong District Pathum Wan District Ratchathewi District Phra Nakhon District Pom Prap Sattru Phai District Bang Khae District Bang Khun Thian District Bang Bon District Thung Khru District Rat Burana District Chom Thong District Khlong San DistrictThon Buri District Phasi Charoen District Taling Chan District Thawi Watthana District Bang Phlat District Bangkok Noi District Bangkok Yai District and Nong Khaem District)

Education in Thailand
Sub-departmental government bodies of Thailand
Ministry of Education (Thailand)